Le cinquième fils (1983), translated as The Fifth Son (1985) is a novel by Elie Wiesel continuing the thematic material of The Testament. It won the Grand Prize in Literature from the city of Paris.

References

1983 French novels
Novels set in Romania
French-language novels
Novels by Elie Wiesel
Éditions Grasset books